Dorcadion suvorovianum is a species of beetle in the family Cerambycidae. It was described by Plavilstshikov in 1916.

See also 
 Dorcadion

References

suvorovianum
Beetles described in 1916